Long Hollow Creek is a stream in Oregon County the Ozarks of southern Missouri. It is a tributary to the Eleven Point River.

Long Hollow Creek was so named on account of the relatively long valley through which it runs.

See also
List of rivers of Missouri

References

Rivers of Oregon County, Missouri
Rivers of Missouri